Ultrabots (called Xenobots in Europe) is a first-person shooter video game developed by NovaLogic for MS-DOS and published by Electronic Arts in 1993. The player controls a group of giant robots and battles other giant robots.

Gameplay

Gameplay consists of deploying a group of robots to an area and engaging enemy forces. Both sides will typically have a number of robots and a base to protect. Damaged robots can return to the base for repairs. As robots take damage they will become harder to control and use as various systems fail.

The user can take direct control of one of the robots in field at will, or leave them autonomous in field and provide only strategic goal-driven control from the base.

Robots
There are three types of robots available in the game:
Humanoid is the main fighting robot. It is the strongest robot available and can deliver and take the most damage.
Scorpion is the infrastructure maintenance robot. It is slow, fragile, and weak in close combat, but it carries a single-shot missile (its scorpion stinging tail) that is the heaviest weapon in the game. Only Scorpions can lay down or dismantle the power grid.
Scout is the fast agile robot used for recon. It is lightly armed but has the longest range when running on batteries, and is capable of laying mines.

Power grid 
A power grid consisting of microwave relays extends power away from the base dome. Robots straying too far from the base dome or relays have to rely on their batteries only, which don't last long and don't offer enough range to reach the enemy base. Much of strategy in the game relies on the power infrastructure, with Scorpions extending lines of relays toward the enemy that Scouts discover far from grid, under protection of Humanoids, to prepare a full attack on the enemy base.

Reception

Computer Gaming World called Ultrabots "a very novel and worthwhile experience". A 1994 survey of strategic space games set in the year 2000 and later gave the game two-plus stars out of five, stating that "Any similarity to Mechwarriors is superficial".

References

External links

1993 video games
DOS games
DOS-only games
Electronic Arts games
First-person shooters
Video games about mecha
NovaLogic games
Video games developed in the United States
Single-player video games